More Brass is an album by jazz trombonist and arranger Kai Winding recorded in 1966 for the Verve label.

Reception

The Allmusic site gave the album 3 stars.

Track listing
 "September Song" (Kurt Weill, Maxwell Anderson) - 3:10
 "Walk On the Wild Side" (Elmer Bernstein, Mack David) - 3:10
 "Laura" (David Raksin, Johnny Mercer) - 2:45
 "It's All Right With Me" (Cole Porter) - 2:10
 "Strange" (Marvin Fisher, John LaTouche) - 2:10
 "More (Theme from Mondo Cane)" (Nino Oliviero, Riz Ortolani) - 2:00
 "Stardust" (Hoagy Carmichael, Mitchell Parish) - 3:30
 "Stella by Starlight" (Victor Young, Ned Washington) - 3:37
 "I'm Getting Sentimental Over You" (George Bassman, Washington) - 4:10
 "Harper" (Johnny Mandel) - 2:15
 "Invitation" (Bronisław Kaper, Paul Francis Webster) - 2:50

Personnel 
Kai Winding - trombone, arranger
Wayne Andre, Carl Fontana, Urbie Green, John Messner, Bill Tole, Bill Watrous - trombone
Dick Lieb, Tony Studd - bass trombone
Paul Griffin, Hank Jones - piano, harpsichord
Kenny Burrell - guitar
Richard Davis - bass
Grady Tate - drums
Bobby Rosengarden - timpani, bongos, percussion
Wayne Andre, (tracks 3 & 9), Dick Lieb (tracks 5, 7 & 8), Oliver Nelson (tracks 1 & 2), Claus Ogerman (tracks 6 & 10), Bobby Scott (track 11)

References 

1966 albums
Verve Records albums
Kai Winding albums
Albums produced by Creed Taylor
Albums arranged by Oliver Nelson
Albums arranged by Claus Ogerman
Albums recorded at Van Gelder Studio